Bavaria non-alcoholic beer is a non-alcoholic beer (0.0% ABV) brewed by the Bavaria Brewery. Like many non-alcoholic beers, sales have recently been increasing rapidly, for example Waitrose reported increases of 11% year on year in 2011.

References 

Non-alcoholic drinks